St. Hyacinthe–Donnacona Navy was an  amateur Canadian football team during the Second World War. They won the Grey Cup in 1944. The team was named after the communications training school  and the naval reserve division .

Game
Both the Western Interprovincial Football Union and the Interprovincial Rugby Football Union had no 1944 regular season due to the Second World War. Lower-ranked leagues did participate for the playoffs. St. Hyacinthe–Donnacona Navy was part of the Quebec Rugby Football Union. On 25 November 1944 the St. Hyacinthe–Donnacona Navy defeated the Hamilton Wildcats 7–6 at the Civic Stadium, in Hamilton, Ontario, to win the 32nd Grey Cup.

Roster
St. Hyacinthe–Donnacona Navy defeated the Hamilton Wildcats at the 32nd Grey Cup.

Championship roster (bold denotes the player played in the Grey Cup game):

Charlie Ellis, Wally Charron, Curly Hiltz, Ginger O’Brien, Bucko McLeod, Glen Brown (Coach), Roy Kirbyson, John Taylor, John Crncich, Steve Levantis, Jack Wedley, Al Hurley, Wally Patch, Malcolm Baker, Hal Chard, Tom Bainbridge, Ian Barclay, Sam Abbott, Whitey Leonard, Dick Swarbrick, Pat Santucci, Dutch Davey, Mickey McFall, Dave Kotavitch, Al Symms, Jim Spicer, Des Campbell, L. Raymond, W.O. John Montague, P.O. George Reid, Bill Kydd, Louis Segatore, Fred Porter, Surgeon Lt. Comdr. Richard Lane, Lt. Christopher Ellis, Moe Segal, Paul Kenwood, Milton Scully, Juan Sheridan

Post 1944
In 1969, the then CFL commissioner Jake Gaudaur, gave the team a chance at championship rings for $300 each.

At the 1994 Grey Cup the CFL paid special homage to the team.

Quebec Rugby Football Union season-by-season

References

External links
 HMCS St.Hyacinthe-Donnacona Navy Combines’ 1944 Season

Grey Cup
Defunct Canadian football teams
Hm
1940s disestablishments in Quebec
1943 establishments in Quebec
1943 in Canadian football
1944 in Canadian football